Ion Frunzetti (1918–1985) was a Romanian art critic and historian. He was vice president of the Union of Fine Artists, head of the Literature and Arts Section of the Academy of Social and Political Sciences, professor at Bucharest's Nicolae Grigorescu Fine Arts Institute and, for a time, director of the Institute of Art History and of Editura Meridiane.

Notes

1918 births
1985 deaths
20th-century Romanian historians
Romanian art historians
Romanian art critics
Academic staff of the Bucharest National University of Arts